Kayo Sugaya is a former Japanese international table tennis player.

Table tennis career
She won a bronze medal at the 1979 World Table Tennis Championships in the Corbillon Cup (women's team event) with Kayoko Kawahigashi, Yoshiko Shimauchi and Shoko Takahashi for Japan.

She also won an Asian Table Tennis Championships mixed doubles medal.

See also
 List of World Table Tennis Championships medalists

References

Japanese female table tennis players
World Table Tennis Championships medalists